Vilmos Galló (born 31 July 1996) is a Hungarian professional ice hockey winger who plays for Linköping HC of the Swedish Hockey League (SHL).

Playing career
Galló has played the majority of his career in Sweden, beginning with Flemingsbergs IK in 2010 where he played for their J18 and J20 teams. In 2013, he joined Linköping HC and played in their junior teams up to the 2015–16 season where he made his debut on their main roster. He joined Timrå IK in 2017, playing initially in the HockeyAllsvenskan before their promotion to the SHL.

On May 20, 2019, Galló moved to Finland and signed for KooKoo of the Liiga. On 14th November 2021, Linköping HC announced that Galló is returning to the team, after four years.

References

External links

1996 births
Living people
Hungarian ice hockey forwards
KooKoo players
Linköping HC players
Luleå HF players
Ice hockey people from Budapest
Timrå IK players
20th-century Hungarian people
21st-century Hungarian people